Douglas Kearney (born 1974) is an American poet, performer and librettist. Kearney grew up in Altadena, California. His work has appeared in Nocturnes, Jubilat, Beloit Poetry Journal, Gulf Coast, Poetry, Pleiades, Iowa Review, Callaloo, Boston Review, Hyperallergic, Scapegoat, Obsidian, Boundary 2, Jacket2, Lana Turner, Brooklyn Rail, and Indiana Review. In 2012, his and Anne LeBaron's opera, Crescent City, premiered and received widespread praise. He is currently an Assistant Professor at the University of Minnesota.

Education
Kearney attended Howard University as an undergraduate. He graduated from California Institute of the Arts, with an MFA (2004).

Awards
 2000-2002 Cave Canem Fellowship
 2004 Bread Loaf Writer's Conference Fellowship
 2004 & 2005 Callaloo Creative Writer's Workshop Fellowship
2006 Coat Hanger Award for poem Swimchant for Nigger Mer-folk
 2007 Returning Fellow fellowships at the Idyllwild Summer Arts Poetry Workshop
2007 Notable New American Poet by the Poetry Society of America
 2008 Whiting Award
 2008 National Poetry Series
2010 Finalist for Pen Center USA Award.
 2014 California Book Awards Poetry Finalist for Patter 
2017 CLMP Firecracker Award for Poetry for Buck Studies
2017 Roethke Memorial Poetry Prize
2017 Silver Medalist, California Book Award (poetry) for Buck Studies
2021 Campbell Opera Librettist Prize
2021 National Book Award Poetry Finalist for Sho
2022 Griffin Poetry Prize, international winner for Sho

Works

Anthologies

Sheree R. Thomas, ed. (2005). Dark Matter: Reading the Bones. Aspect. 

Mark Eleveld, ed. (2007) Spoken Word Revolution Redux. Sourcebooks MediaFusion. 
Sherman Alexie, David Lehman, eds (2015) Best American Poetry 2015 Scribner Press.

References

External links
Douglas Kearney's website
Profile at The Whiting Foundation
"Douglas Kearney", Fishouse
"History, Reconciliation, and Form: A Conversation Between Amaud J. Johnson & Douglas Kearney", Boxcar Poetry Review, 2008
"Douglas Kearney reads “A Poison Tree” by William Blake", Poets on Poets

Living people
American male poets
California Institute of the Arts alumni
University of Minnesota faculty
1974 births
21st-century American poets
21st-century American male writers
African-American male writers
African-American poets